"Lucky Star" is a 2000 song by Marseilles group Superfunk. It was the group's breakout single and sold more than 500,000 units worldwide, reaching 42 on the UK Singles Chart. The song contains a sample of Chris Rea's "Josephine". It was re-released with a remix package in 2009.

"Lucky Star 2009" track listing
 "Lucky Star 2009" (Ron Carroll 4Da Radio Mix) 4:24
 "Lucky Star 2009" (Ron Carroll 4Da Club Mix) 5:21
 "Lucky Star 2009" (Ron Carroll Remix) 9:22
 "Lucky Star 2009" (David Vendetta Radio Edit) 3:42
 "Lucky Star 2009" (David Vendetta Remix) 8:35
 "Lucky Star 2009" (D.O.N.S Radio Edit) 3:31
 "Lucky Star 2009" (D.O.N.S Remix) 8:39
 "Lucky Star 2009" (Dim Chris Remix) 7:50
 "Lucky Star 2009" (Acappella) 4:30

Charts

Weekly charts

Year-end charts

References

2000 songs
2000 singles
Virgin Records singles
French electronic songs